The following is a list of elected members of the American Academy of Arts and Sciences from the years 1994 to 2005.

1994 

 Hans Aarsleff
 Jan Drewes Achenbach
 Frances Elizabeth Allen
 Frederick Wayne Alt
 John Charles Avise
 Jack Edward Baldwin
 Leonard Barkan
 Lucius Barker
 Paul A. Bartlett
 Marlene Belfort
 Chester Gordon Bell
 Thomas Bender
 Albert F. Bennett
 Margaret Hilda Bent
 Malcolm Bilson
 Norman M. Bradburn
 Haim Brezis
 Roberta Lea Brilmayer
 Robert A. Brown
 Theodore Lawrence Brown
 Colin Goetze Campbell
 Marvin Harry Caruthers
 Jean-Pierre Changeux
 Thomas Warren Cline
 Marjorie Benedict Cohn
 Ronald Raphael Coifman
 James Pierpont Comer
 Joseph T. Coyle
 Robert Dallek
 Mirjan R. Damaska
 Drew Saunders Days III
 Donald James DePaolo
 Robert Carr Dynes
 Diana Eck
 Claire Mintzer Fagin
 Drew Gilpin Faust
 Steven Feld
 Gary J. Feldman
 Harvey V. Fineberg
 Marye Anne Fox
 Jack H. Freed
 Elaine V. Fuchs
 Frank F. Furstenberg, Jr.
 Ellen V. Futter
 Philip Glass
 David VanNorman Goeddel
 Eville Gorham
 Jerry Richard Green
 Linda Greenhouse
 Robert H. Grubbs
 Zach Winter Hall
 Ulf Hannerz
 Carl Eugene Heiles
 Eric Johnson Heller
 David Forbes Hendry
 Eileen Mavis Hetherington
 Thomas Hines
 Philip John Holmes
 H. Robert Horvitz
 Susan Band Horwitz
 Richard Olding Hynes
 Robert A. Kagan
 Robert E. Kahn
 Thomas Kailath
 Arthur Karlin
 Alan Curtis Kay
 Nikki Ragozin Keddie
 William Nimmons Kelley
 David Woods Kemper
 Walid Ahmad Khalidi
 Sung-Hou Kim
 Rosalind E. Krauss
 Keith Krehbiel
 Anthony Townsend Kronman
 Shrinivas Ramchandra Kulkarni
 Madeleine M. Kunin
 Arthur Landy
 Robert Samuel Langer
 Laurence Lesser
 Wendy Lesser
 James Levine
 Elliott Hershel Lieb
 Sharon R. Long
 Stewart Macaulay
 Jane J. Mansbridge
 Charles Frederick Manski
 Hazel Rose Markus
 Eric Stark Maskin
 Cormac McCarthy
 William H. McClain
 David McCullough
 Jerome John McGann
 Richard A. Meserve
 Thomas J. Meyer
 Yves Francois Meyer
 Mary Ellen Miller
 Joseph Standard Miller
 Alexander Nehamas
 James Rufus Norris, Jr.
 Stephen James O'Brien
 Stephen Kitay Orgel
 June Elaine Osborn
 Charles Samuel Peskin
 Vivian Winona Pinn
 Karl Stark Pister
 Sylvia Poggioli
 David E. Pritchard
 Richard Emeric Quandt
 Pasko Rakic
 Elio Secondo Raviola
 John D. Reppy
 JoAnne Stewart Richards
 Paul A. Robinson
 Kevin Roche
 Ronald Lynn Rogowski
 Antone Kimball Romney
 Carol Marguerite Rose
 Richard Rose
 James Edward Rothman
 Michael Rothschild
 Ariel Rubinstein
 Angelica Zander Rudenstine
 Arlene Warmbrunn Saxonhouse
 Wolfgang M. Schmidt
 Robert James Shiller
 David Oliver Siegmund
 Leon Melvyn Simon
 Beryl Brintnall Simpson
 Anna Marie Skalka
 Theda Skocpol
 Brian Skyrms
 Larry L. Smarr
 Jane Graves Smiley
 Robert Martin Solovay
 Davor Solter
 Patricia Meyer Spacks
 Stephen Frederick Starr
 Louis Wade Sullivan
 Leonard Susskind
 Ivan Edward Sutherland
 Dennis F. Thompson
 Glauco Pasquale Tocchini-Valentini
 Alain L. J. F. Touraine
 Robert Morris Townsend
 Leo Treitler
 Donald Lawson Turcotte
 Anne Tyler
 David Walker
 H. Eric Wanner
 G. Edward White
 Andrew J. Wiles
 Lewis T. Williams
 James David Wolfensohn
 Charles Edward Young

1995 

 Morton I. Abramowitz
 Christopher Henry Achen
 Everett Anderson
 Kwame Anthony Appiah
 Clyde Frederick Barker
 Larry Martin Bartels
 Linda May Bartoshuk
 Seyla Benhabib
 Bruce J. Berne
 Manuel Blum
 Piet Borst
 James Hemphill Brown
 David Alvin Buchsbaum
 Dennis Anthony Carson
 Stephen Lisle Carter
 Vinton Gray Cerf
 Jon Christel Clardy
 Jean Comaroff
 John Lionel Comaroff
 Richard Arthur Crawford
 Louis Dupre
 Anne Howland Ehrlich
 Robert Chester Ellickson
 Robert Fry Engle
 David Hackett Fischer
 Zachary Fisk
 Owen Mitchell Fiss
 Wendell Helms Fleming
 Alan Bicksler Fowler
 Harry Gordon Frankfurt
 Hillel Furstenberg
 John Lewis Gaddis
 Howard E. Gardner
 Gordon Nelson Gill
 Stephen Payne Goff
 Peter Alexis Gourevitch
 Susan Graham
 Agnes Gund
 Rachel C. Hadas
 William Happer
 Stephen Ernest Harris
 J. Bryan Hehir
 John L. Hennessy
 Barbara Herman
 Richard Ralph Hudson
 Hiroo Imura
 Terence Henry Irwin
 Henryk Iwaniec
 Paul Christian Jennings
 Betsy Jolas
 Herbert Leon Kessler
 Judith Elisabeth Kimble
 Charles Kimmel
 Richard D. Klausner
 Joseph Leo Koerner
 Stephen Michael Kosslyn
 David Dennis Laitin
 Phyllis Lambert
 Alan Marc Lambowitz
 Neal Francis Lane
 Hartmut Lehmann
 Raphael David Levine
 William Carl Lineberger
 Geoffrey Ernest Richard Lloyd
 Shirley Mahaley Malcom
 Douglas S. Massey
 Dusa McDuff
 Ian Russell McEwan
 Richard Alan Meier
 Douglas A. Melton
 Robert M. Metcalfe
 Barbara Jean Meyer
 Ira Martin Millstein
 Katharine Milton
 Robert Harris Mnookin
 Gary Saul Morson
 Shigetada Nakanishi
 Bruce Lee Nauman
 Malden Charles Nesheim
 Joseph Paul Newhouse
 Ronald Leslie Numbers
 John W. O'Malley
 Claus Offe
 James Lowe Peacock III
 William Daniel Phillips
 Charles Young Prescott
 Stephen Joseph Pyne
 Veerabhadran Ramanathan
 Hunter Ripley Rawlings III
 Anthony Christopher Sanford Readhead
 D. Raj Reddy
 Jehuda Reinharz
 Jeffrey Warren Roberts
 Robert Gayle Roeder
 Roberta Romano
 Robert M. Rosenzweig
 William Bailey Russel
 Bruce Martin Russett
 Richard James Saykally
 William H. Schlesinger
 Richard Lee Schmalensee
 Stuart Lee Schreiber
 Alan Schwartz
 Larry Jay Shapiro
 John B. Shoven
 Sean Carl Solomon
 Robert Jeffrey Sternberg
 G. David Tilman
 Susan Mary Treggiari
 James Wellington Truran, Jr.
 Roger Harold Unger
 Hal Ronald Varian
 Diana Chapman Walsh
 Gungwu Wang
 Michael Spencer Waterman
 Gerald Westheimer
 Hans Lennart Rudolf Wigzell
 Jay Wright
 Peter Edwin Wright
 William Allan Wulf
 King-Wai Yau
 Anne Buckingham Young

1996 

 Karim Aga Khan IV
 Christopher Wolfgang John Alexander
 Jeanne Altmann
 Boris Altshuler
 Kathryn Virginia Anderson
 Spyros Artavanis-Tsakonas
 Alan David Baddeley
 Dorothy Ford Bainton
 Douglas Gordon Baird
 Russell Banks
 Solomon R. Benatar
 Joe Claude Bennett
 May Roberta Berenbaum
 Peter Stephen Bing
 Helen Margaret Blau
 Bill Bradley
 Maurice S. Brookhart
 Jonathan Brown
 Larry Lee Bumpass
 Lisa Sowle Cahill
 Albert Carnesale
 Brian Charlesworth
 Adele Chatfield-Taylor
 Carol J. Clover
 Karen Schweers Cook
 William J. Courtenay
 Gary Walter Cox
 David Pafford Crews
 William Drayton
 Thomas Ehrlich
 Richard R. Ernst
 Nancy Marguerite Farriss
 Kent Vaughn Flannery
 Richard Irving Ford
 Edward Norval Fortson
 Norman Robert Foster
 Richard James Franke
 Richard B. Freeman
 Jacob Aharon Frenkel
 Marc Fumaroli
 Douglas Joel Futuyma
 Elsa Garmire
 C.W. Gear
 Alexander N. Glazer
 Laurie Hollis Glimcher
 Robert Phillip Goldman
 Joseph W. Goodman
 Edward Everett Harlow, Jr.
 Jennifer L. Hochschild
 Tomas Gustav Magnus Hokfelt
 Peter Maxwell Howley
 Martin Evan Jay
 Michael Cole Jensen
 Thomas Hillman Jordan
 Martin John Kemp
 David Michael Kennedy
 Sergiu Klainerman
 Eric Ingvald Knudsen
 Nancy Jane Kopell
 Jane Kramer
 Howard G. Krane
 Story Cleland Landis
 Anthony James Leggett
 Hendrik Willem Lenstra, Jr.
 Michael Levine
 Alan Lightman
 Rodolfo Riascos Llinas
 Richard Marc Losick
 Thomas Eugene Lovejoy
 Fumihiko Maki
 Jean Matter Mandler
 Karl Ulrich Mayer
 Perry Lee McCarty
 Michael William McConnell
 Joel Mokyr
 C. Bradley Moore
 Susumu Nishimura
 Bert W. O'Malley
 John Alexander Oates, Jr.
 Laurie Dewar Olin
 Larry Eugene Overman
 Charles Stedman Parmenter
 Carole Pateman
 Joseph Pedlosky
 Paul Elliott Peterson
 Peter Charles Bonest Phillips
 James Michael Poterba
 Michael C. J. Putnam
 Anna Marie Quindlen
 Robert Richard Rando
 Ellen Rosand
 Marshall Rose
 Ira Rubinoff
 Jeffrey David Sachs
 Moshe Safdie
 Richard Lawrence Salmon
 David Satcher
 Henry Schacht
 Daniel Lawrence Schacter
 Gjertrud Schnackenberg
 Jerome Borges Schneewind
 Matthew P. Scott
 Richard Sennett
 Salvatore Settis
 Robert Bernard Shapiro
 Richard Martin Shiffrin
 Kenneth I. Shine
 Carolyn Spellman Shoemaker
 Sydney Shoemaker
 Michael Louis Shuler
 Kai Lennart Simons
 Lawrence Sklar
 Larry Ryan Squire
 Claude Mason Steele
 Thomas Peter Stossel
 Marilyn Strathern
 Harry Suhl
 Kathleen Marie Sullivan
 John David Summers
 Gerald Jay Sussman
 Piotr Sztompka
 Saul A. Teukolsky
 Gerard Toulouse
 Michael Stanley Turner
 Kensal Edward van Holde
 Anthony Vidler
 George Joseph Vining
 David Alexander Vogan
 Kenneth Wilcox Wachter
 E. Bruce Watson
 James Lee Watson
 Gerhard Ludwig Weinberg
 Barry R. Weingast
 Mary Jane West-Eberhard
 Robert Louis Wilken
 Owen N. Witte
 Chi-Huey Wong
 Sau Lan Yu Wu
 Alexey Vladimirovich Yablokov
 Efim Zelmanov
 Nicholas Themistocles Zervas

1997 

 Francois M. Abboud
 Shirley S. Abrahamson
 Robert Kemp Adair
 John Adams
 Alan Altshuler
 George E. Andrews
 Arjun Appadurai
 Elizabeth Ellery Bailey
 Stephanie Barron
 B. Douglas Bernheim
 Pamela J. Bjorkman
 Steven George Boxer
 Bob Branch Buchanan
 Lincoln Chih-ho Chen
 Elizabeth Ann Clark
 John Collins Coffee, Jr.
 Johnnetta B. Cole
 Antoine Compagnon
 Mihaly Csikszentmihalyi
 Peter Dallos
 Antonio R. Damasio
 Hanna Damasio
 Arthur P. Dempster
 Jack E. Dixon
 Jack David Dunitz
 Gerald Early
 William Allen Eaton
 Barry Eichengreen
 Ronald M. Evans
 George W. Flynn
 Uta Francke
 David Freedberg
 Charles Fried
 Michael Friedman
 Henry Fuchs
 Michael Saunders Gazzaniga
 Sandra M. Gilbert
 Robert James Gordon
 Barbara Rosemary Grant
 Peter Raymond Grant
 Laura H. Greene
 Gene M. Grossman
 Amy Gutmann
 Stephen L. Hauser
 Russell Hemley
 Michael Herzfeld
 Karl Hess
 David Ho
 David Hockney
 David A. Hollinger
 Donald R. Hopkins
 James Stephen House
 Michael Hout
 Richard Timothy Hunt
 Andrew P. Ingersoll
 Robert Israel
 Deborah Jowitt
 Yale Kamisar
 George Anthony Kateb
 Hiroya Kawanabe
 Cynthia J. Kenyon
 Linda K. Kerber
 Miles Vincent Klein
 Bill Kovach
 Donald Stephen Lamm
 Russell Lande
 Charles H. Langmuir
 Ronald Michael Latanision
 Douglas Laycock
 Philip Randolph Lee
 Kristin Luker
 Lamberto Maffei
 Joyce Marcus
 Wynton Marsalis
 Alice Munro
 Sidney R. Nagel
 Gary B. Nash
 Richard Robinson Nelson
 Bruno Nettl
 Sam Nunn
 James T. Patterson
 Stanley G. Payne
 Norman Pearlstine
 Marjorie Gabrielle Perloff
 Chester Middlebrook Pierce
 Tomaso Poggio
 Robert Hugh Porter
 Douglas C. Rees
 Kenneth A. Ribet
 Condoleezza Rice
 Richard J. Roberts
 Renato Rosaldo
 Michael Rosbash
 Steven J. Rosenstone
 Martin Saunders
 Stephen A. Shectman
 Roger Valentine Short
 Richard A. Shweder
 Ruth Simmons
 Montgomery Slatkin
 Paul M. Sniderman
 László Somfai
 Richard Rustom K. Sorabji
 David Souter
 Elizabeth S. Spelke
 James A. Spudich
 Katepalli R. Sreenivasan
 Theodore Ellis Stebbins, Jr.
 Eric J. Sundquist
 Robert Tjian
 John C. Tully
 J. Anthony Tyson
 Bas C. van Fraassen
 Grace Wahba
 David Burton Wake
 John Michael Wallace
 John Walsh
 Rosanna Warren
 Patty Jo Watson
 Watt W. Webb
 Robert E. Williams
 Michel Zink

1998 

 Walter Abish
 Eric G. Adelberger
 Linda H. Aiken
 Wyatt W. Anderson
 William Allan Bardeen
 Paul Benacerraf
 Arnold J. Berk
 Ellen S. Berscheid
 Henry S. Bienen
 David P. Billington
 Vincent A. Blasi
 Catherine Brechignac
 David Bromwich
 Louis Eugene Brus
 Jose Alberto Cabranes
 Federico Capasso
 David E. Card
 James Carroll
 Vija Celmins
 Constance Louise Cepko
 Joanne Chory
 Adrienne Elizabeth Clarke
 Chuck Close
 Francis S. Collins
 Pierre Corvol
 F. Fleming Crim
 Robert Floyd Curl Jr.
 Frank A. D'Accone
 William F. DeGrado
 David Ferry
 Robert Warren Field
 Cornell Hugh Fleischer
 G. David Forney, Jr.
 Drew Fudenberg
 William Fulton
 Anthony Giddens
 Doris Kearns Goodwin
 Fan Chung Graham
 Hans Ulrich Gumbrecht
 Ellen Harris
 Daniel L. Hartl
 Leland H. Hartwell
 Bertil Hille
 Charles Hirschman
 Darleane Christian Hoffman
 Nancy Hopkins
 Maureen Howard
 Clyde A. Hutchison III
 Diane Johnson
 Christopher Prestige Jones
 Peter Wilcox Jones
 Edward L. Keenan
 Randall L. Kennedy
 Eric Barrington Keverne
 Gary King
 Margaret Galland Kivelson
 Julia Kristeva
 Patricia K. Kuhl
 Richard Erskine Leakey
 Ruth Lehmann
 Richard E. Lenski
 Richard Levin
 Richard Jay Light
 Penelope Jo Maddy
 Cora Bagley Marrett
 John C. Mather
 Curtis Tracy McMullen
 Steven Millhauser
 Dino Moras
 Robert Alexander Mundell
 Alicia H. Munnell
 Kevin M. Murphy
 Ken Nakayama
 Francis Oakley
 Elinor Ruth Ochs
 Eric Newell Olson
 Neil D. Opdyke
 Christopher Francis Patten
 Steven Pinker
 Alejandro Portes
 Richard Powers
 Helen R. Quinn
 Mitchell T. Rabkin
 Marcus E. Raichle
 Pierre Ramond
 John Shepard Reed
 Donald H. Regan
 Daniel Roche
 Alvin Roth
 Richard H. Scheller
 John P. Schiffer
 David Neil Sedley
 Vladimir A. Shuvalov
 Yum-Tong Siu
 Mitchell Lloyd Sogin
 Edward Ira Solomon
 George Soros
 Nicholas H. Stern
 Samuel I. Stupp
 Elizabeth Alison Thompson
 John G. Thompson
 Richard Winyu Tsien
 Billie Lee Turner II
 Michele Francoise Vergne
 Miguel Virasoro
 Jeremy James Waldron
 Immanuel Wallerstein
 Kendall Lewis Walton
 Rainer Weiss
 Michael J. Welsh
 Richard White
 Reed Brendon Wickner
 Carl E. Wieman
 John Noble Wilford
 Carl Wu
 Pauline Yu
 John Raymond Zaller
 Neal Zaslaw
 Rolf Martin Zinkernagel
 Stephen Lawrence Zipursky
 Jacob Ziv

1999 

 Jane Alexander
 Stephen Robert Anderson
 John Robert Anderson
 Akito Arima
 Clay Margrave Armstrong
 Alan J. Auerbach
 Jonathan Barnes
 Percy Barnevik
 Robert M. Berdahl
 Michael Boudin
 Timothy Bresnahan
 Howard Franklin Bunn
 Lewis C. Cantley
 Anne Carson
 David M. Ceperley
 Robert D. Cooter
 Brian P. Copenhaver
 Lester Crown
 Bruce Cumings
 Veena Das
 Guy R. P. David
 Walter Dellinger
 Francois N. Diederich
 Dennis A. Dougherty
 Louise Erdrich
 Daniel J. Evans
 Jonathan Fanton
 Daniel A. Farber
 Michael D. Fayer
 Douglas T. Fearon
 Walter Charles Cornelius Fiers
 Alan Finkelstein
 Daniel S. Fisher
 Lee Friedlander
 Robert G. Gallager
 Claire L. Gaudiani
 John Geanakoplos
 Rochel Gelman
 Ronald J. Gilson
 Michael A. Gimbrone, Jr.
 Lila R. Gleitman
 Richard J. Goldstone
 Roberto Gonzalez Echevarria
 James Russell Gordley
 Susan Gottesman
 Jorie Graham
 Charles G. Gross
 Paul D. Guyer
 Wick C. Haxton
 Martha Patricia Haynes
 Walter B. Hewlett
 Susan Howe
 Louis Joseph Ignarro
 David Jerison
 Bill Joy
 Jerome P. Kassirer
 Elihu Katz
 Thomas C. Kaufman
 Garrison Keillor
 Charles Frederick Kennel
 Wolfgang Ketterle
 Mary-Claire King
 V. A. Kolve
 Roger D. Kornberg
 Eric S. Lander
 Thomas Laqueur
 Judith W. Leavitt
 John O. Ledyard
 Typhoon Lee
 Wen-Hsiung Li
 Lawrence Lipking
 Harvey F. Lodish
 Joan Massague
 Martha K. McClintock
 Christopher F. McKee
 Marcia K. McNutt
 Michael Menaker
 Josef Michl
 George Mitchell
 Terry M. Moe
 Barry Munitz
 Roddam Narasimha
 Kim Nasmyth
 Peter Nicholas
 Roger Andrew Nicoll
 Harry F. Noller
 Mary Beth Norton
 Tim O'Brien
 Emiko Ohnuki-Tierney
 Ursula Oppens
 Jeffrey D. Palmer
 Thomas Pavel
 Alan S. Perelson
 Alexander Pines
 Robert A. Pollak
 Dale Purves
 Martin Raff
 Jack N. Rakove
 Mamphela Ramphele
 John Reid
 Peter B. Rhines
 William C. Richardson
 Morton S. Roberts
 Elihu Rose
 Hans Thomas Rossby
 Bernard Rossier
 John Gerard Ruggie
 Jeremy Arac Sabloff
 Boris G. Saltykov
 Myriam P. Sarachik
 Juergen Schrempp
 Gertrud Schüpbach
 Robert E. Scott
 Christine Seidman
 Jonathan Seidman
 Barbara Herrnstein Smith
 Jack L. Snyder
 Elliott Sober
 Thomas Spencer
 Steven Spielberg
 Jack W. Szostak
 Jean E. Taylor
 Lars Y. Terenius
 Craig B. Thompson
 Michael Trebilcock
 Calvin Trillin
 Dale J. Van Harlingen
 David Ward
 James Webster
 Joseph H. H. Weiler
 Cornel West
 Edmund White
 Malcolm H. Wiener
 Michael H. Wigler
 Irene J. Winter
 Peter Thomas Wolczanski
 Susan Rose Wolf
 Eugene Wong
 Adam Zagajewski

2000 

 Martina Arroyo
 David Austen-Smith
 Roger Shaler Bagnall
 Jeremiah Abraham Barondess
 Lucian Arye Bebchuk
 Steven M. Block
 Richard Ewen Borcherds
 Willard Lee Boyd
 Nicholas F. Brady
 Robert Brandom
 Joan S. Brugge
 Stephen Leffler Buchwald
 Bruce E. Cain
 Roberto Calasso
 John Y. Campbell
 Nancy E. Cantor
 John E. Carlstrom
 Paul DeWitt Carrington
 Hal Caswell
 William A. Catterall
 John T. Chambers
 David E. Clapham
 Donald Delbert Clayton
 Randall Collins
 Joel Conarroe
 Gordon Conway
 Thomas Cook
 Robert Coover
 Elizabeth A. Craig
 Michael G. Crandall
 Roberto Augusto DaMatta
 Mark M. Davis
 Edward Michael De Robertis
 Jan de Vries
 Placido Domingo
 Jonathan Manne Dorfan
 William F. Dove
 Richard Slator Dunn
 William G. Eberhard
 Robert H. Edwards
 Peter David Eisenman
 David T. Ellwood
 William Nichol Eskridge Jr.
 Michael Frayn
 Jean M. J. Fréchet
 Wendy L. Freedman
 Saul Friedländer
 Arthur Gelb
 Michael Erwin Gellert
 Louis V. Gerstner, Jr.
 Arturo Gomez-Pompa
 Roger S.M.A. Guesnerie
 Allan Gurganus
 Jan-Ake Gustafsson
 Susan Easton Hanson
 Franz-Ulrich Hartl
 Teresa F. Heinz
 David M. Hillis
 Paul W. Hoffman
 Denis Hollier
 Stanley O. Ikenberry
 David Jablonski
 Ray S. Jackendoff
 Torrence V. Johnson
 Anita Katherine Jones
 Charles H. Kahn
 Ira Katznelson
 Mervyn King
 Thomas Kinsella
 Harold Hongju Koh
 David L. Kohlstedt
 Douglas E. Koshland
 Robert M. Krauss
 John Richard Krebs
 Thomas Krens
 Edward Paul Lazear
 Stephen R. Leone
 Richard Alan Lerner
 Robert D. Levin
 Saul Levmore
 Lance Malcolm Liebman
 Martin Lipton
 Donald Sewell Lopez, Jr.
 Glenn C. Loury
 George W. Lucas
 Thomas Lee Magnanti
 Ann Elizabeth McDermott
 Heather McHugh
 David W. McLaughlin
 Helen V. Milner
 Charles W. Misner
 Paul Muldoon
 Andrew W. Murray
 Jeremy Nathans
 Daniel M. Neumark
 
 George Papanicolaou
 Annabel M. Patterson
 Roger M. Perlmutter
 Michael E. Peskin
 Hidde L. Ploegh
 Menahem Pressler
 Hugh B. Price
 Carol L. Prives
 Judith Livant Rapoport
 Claude Rawson
 David W. Rohde
 Paul Michael Romer
 Paul Rozin
 Robert Ryman
 David Warren Sabean
 Randy W. Schekman
 Ian Shapiro
 Kay Kaufman Shelemay
 Andrei Shleifer
 Jonathan Z. Smith
 Lawrence W. Sonsini
 Paul W. Sternberg
 James A. Stimson
 Lars E. O. Svensson
 Iván Szelényi
 Clifford J. Tabin
 Joseph S. Takahashi
 David W. Tank
 Richard H. Thaler
 Michael Oliver Thorner
 Daniel C. Tsui
 Leslie Ungerleider
 Andries van Dam
 Inder M. Verma
 Bill Viola
 Robert Manuel Wald
 John David Weeks
 Ewald Rudolf Weibel
 Benjamin Weiss
 W. Hugh Woodin
 Moshe Yaniv
 Andrew C. C. Yao

2001 

 Jill Abramson
 Dilip J. Abreu
 Madeleine Korbel Albright
 John Aldrich
 Woody Allen
 C. David Allis
 Edward Ayers
 John H. Baker
 Teodolinda Barolini
 Riley P. Bechtel
 Gillian Beer
 Ben S. Bernanke
 Timothy J. Berners-Lee
 Sara Sweezy Berry
 Gordon M. Binder
 Allan M. Brandt
 Eli Broad
 Maurice B. Burg
 Guy L. Bush
 Richard M. Buxbaum
 Mary Schmidt Campbell
 Susan E. Carey
 Nancy Cartwright
 Anthony Cerami
 William H. Chafe
 Demetrios Christodoulou
 Mary Sue Coleman
 George Henry Conrades
 Frederick Cooper
 John M. Cooper
 Suzanne Cory
 Thomas Crow
 Jonathan Culler
 James Cuno
 Constantine M. Dafermos
 Stephen Darwall
 Robert Addison Day
 Pietro V. De Camilli
 Andrew Delbanco
 William M. Denevan
 Morton M. Denn
 David DeRosier
 Robert Desimone
 Ronald Alvin DeVore
 W. S. Di Piero
 Douglas W. Diamond
 Ariel Dorfman
 Michael W. Doyle
 Greg J. Duncan
 Eli N. Evans
 Peter Evans
 Jeffrey Scott Flier
 Henry W. Foster, Jr.
 
 Frank Galati
 Charles R. Gallistel
 Charles D. Gilbert
 Sid Gilman
 Philip D. Gingerich
 Shafi Goldwasser
 Antonio Marion Gotto, Jr.
 Dieter Grimm
 Bernard N. Grofman
 Michael Grunstein
 Alma Guillermoprieto
 Jeffrey C. Hall
 John Benjamin Heywood
 Rosalyn Higgins
 John G. Hildebrand
 Brigid L. M. Hogan
 Matthew Holden, Jr.
 Freeman A. Hrabowski III
 Wayne Lester Hubbell
 Richard Lewis Huganir
 Barbara Imperiali
 Jeremy Bradford Cook Jackson
 Irwin Mark Jacobs
 Frances C. James
 Kathleen Hall Jamieson
 James A. Johnson
 Quincy Jones
 Jon H. Kaas
 Lawrence F. Katz
 Robert C. Kennicutt, Jr.
 Steven Allan Kivelson
 Christine Marion Korsgaard
 Richard Kramer
 Douglas A. Lauffenburger
 Paul LeClerc
 Seng Tee Lee
 Jeffrey Marc Leiden
 Margaret Levi
 Sanford Victor Levinson
 Stuart M. Linn
 David Morse Livingston
 Eve Marder
 Michael A. Marletta
 Margaret H. Marshall
 Giuseppe E. Mazzotta
 Mathew D. McCubbins
 Jacques Mehler
 Ira Mellman
 William Esco Moerner
 Lorrie Moore
 Cherry A. Murray
 Burt Neuborne
 Elissa L. Newport
 Ryoji Noyori
 Roeland Nusse
 Gilbert S. Omenn
 Geneva Overholser
 Christos Papadimitriou
 Torsten Persson
 Robert Plomin
 Klaus Rajewsky
 Don Michael Randel
 Mark A. Ratner
 Stephen W. Raudenbush
 Kenneth N. Raymond
 Judith Resnik
 William S. Reznikoff
 Diana Rigg
 Paul H. Roberts
 Kenneth S. Rogoff
 F. James Rohlf
 Barbara A. Romanowicz
 E. John Rosenwald, Jr.
 Robert Rosner
 Lucia B. Rothman-Denes
 Robert E. Rubin
 Daniel Rubinfeld
 Michael Joseph Ryan
 Luc Marie Sante
 Joseph Schlessinger
 Gerald Schubert
 Elisabeth Schussler Fiorenza
 Joanna Scott
 Thomas Dyer Seeley
 Nathan Seiberg
 Teddy I. Seidenfeld
 John Sexton
 Wallace Shawn
 Kathryn A. Sikkink
 Leslie Marmon Silko
 Werner Sollors
 Stephen Sondheim
 Ernest Sosa
 Timothy Alan Springer
 Andrew Strominger
 Eva Tardos
 Gary Tomlinson
 Eugene Ulrich
 J. Craig Venter
 Andrew J. Viterbi
 Lawrence Weschler
 John Burnard West
 Ralph K. Winter
 M. Norton Wise
 Stanford E. Woosley
 James Wright
 Margaret H. Wright
 Edward Anthony Wrigley
 Fred Wudl
 Horng-Tzer Yau
 Janet L. Yellen
 Mark G. Yudof
 Froma I. Zeitlin
 Charles Zuker

2002 

 Bernard William Agranoff
 Amnon Aharony
 Giuliano Amato
 Richard A. Andersen
 David J. Anderson
 Nancy C. Andreasen
 R. Douglas Arnold
 Cornelia Isabella Bargmann
 Wolfgang P. Baumeister
 Adriaan Bax
 Lewis W. Bernard
 Kenneth George Binmore
 Joel S. Birnbaum
 Mina J. Bissell
 Richard Blundell
 Robert F. Boruch
 Edouard Brezin
 Robert L. Bryant
 Mark A. Cane
 F. Stuart Chapin III
 David D. Clark
 John Allen Clements
 Joshua Cohen
 Lewis W. Coleman
 Rita Rossi Colwell
 Joan W. Conaway
 Ronald C. Conaway
 Bonnie Costello
 Shaun Robert Coughlin
 Sheldon H. Danziger
 Ann Douglas
 Richard Timothy Durrett
 Carol S. Dweck
 William S. Edgerly
 William L. Fash, Jr.
 James D. Fearon
 Frances Daly Fergusson
 Mark Charles Fishman
 James G. Fujimoto
 Robert Berj Gagosian
 Jonathan Galassi
 Catherine Gallagher
 William A. Gamson
 Alice Petry Gast
 Apostolos P. Georgopoulos
 Irma Gigli
 Linda Gordon
 Anthony Grafton
 Everett Peter Greenberg
 Robert M. Greenstein
 Theodore Groves
 Gustavo Gutierrez
 Brian Keith Hall
 Delon Hampton
 William V. Harris
 Joseph D. Harris
 Siegfried S. Hecker
 Brian M. Hoffman
 Steven Holl
 Michael J. Hopkins
 Amos B. Hostetter, Jr.
 K. N. Houk
 Albert James Hudspeth
 Anjelica Huston
 Keith Jarrett
 Jacqueline Jones
 Randy H. Katz
 Carlos E. Kenig
 William Kennedy
 Mary Bernadette Kennedy
 David A. Kessler
 Philip S. Khoury
 Susan Marie Kidwell
 Elliott Dan Kieff
 David A. King
 William E. Kirwan
 Philip S. Kitcher
 Herbert P. Kitschelt
 Mimi A. R. Koehl
 Edward W. Kolb
 Milan Kundera
 Leonard A. Lauder
 Ang Lee
 Anthony Lester
 Steven Levitt
 David Levering Lewis
 Charles M. Lieber
 Douglas N. C. Lin
 Michael Loewe
 Kenneth Marc Ludmerer
 Michael Lynch
 Mark J. Machina
 Iain William Mattaj
 Claire Ellen Max
 Renate Mayntz
 Peter McCullagh
 Bernard J. McGinn
 Harry Y. McSween Jr.
 Anthony R. Means
 Douglas L. Medin
 Georg Fritz Melchers
 Felix Mitelman
 John Hardman Moore
 William W. Murdoch
 William D. Nix
 Victor Nussenzweig
 Kenzaburo Oe
 Jerrold M. Olefsky
 David Woodley Packard
 Ariel Pakes
 Herbert Pardes
 Katharine Park
 Itzhak Perlman
 Elizabeth J. Perry
 John R. Perry
 Gregory A. Petsko
 Carl H. Pforzheimer III
 James Stewart Polshek
 Robert N. Proctor
 Wayne Proudfoot
 Matthew Rabin
 Bruce Redford
 Joseph J. Rishel
 Giacomo Rizzolatti
 Tina Rosenberg
 Ingrid D. Rowland
 Virginia Sapiro
 Fritz W. Scharpf
 George Chappell Schatz
 Klaus R. Scherer
 Sara Lee Schupf
 Rebecca J. Scott
 Steven M. Shavell
 Thomas E. Shenk
 Lee S. Shulman
 Charles Simic
 Anne-Marie Slaughter
 Bruce Michael Spiegelman
 Nicholas Canaday Spitzer
 Robert F. Sproull
 Peter John Stang
 Guy L. Steele Jr.
 David A. Strauss
 Michael P. Stryker
 Lawrence E. Sullivan
 Jacob Wilhelm Fredrik Sundberg
 William W. Tait
 Naoyuki Takahata
 Mark H. Thiemens
 Stephen Joel Trachtenberg
 Michael Traynor
 Yi-Fu Tuan
 Mark V. Tushnet
 Laura D'Andrea Tyson
 Ronald D. Vale
 Robert W. Vishny
 Peter Walter
 Timothy Douglas White
 John A. Whitehead
 Sue Hengren Wickner
 Clifford M. Will
 Ian Andrew Wilson
 Mark Brian Wise
 Thomas Adams Witten
 Irving Wladawsky-Berger
 Richard Vance Wolfenden
 Allen W. Wood
 Charles Wright

2003 

 Rolena Adorno
 Peter Courtland Agre
 Alfred V. Aho
 Thomas D. Albright
 Drew E. Altman
 Fred Colvig Anson
 Aloisio Araujo
 James Grieg Arthur
 William R. Atchley
 Dennis A. Ausiello
 Paul Auster
 Frederick M. Ausubel
 Phaedon Avouris
 Lloyd Axworthy
 Lawrence S. Bacow
 Allan I. Basbaum
 Philip Beachy
 Alain Berthoz
 Catherine Ann Bertini
 Carolyn R. Bertozzi
 J. Richard Bond
 Alan Paul Boss
 Henry E. Brady
 Thomas A. Brady, Jr
 William R. Brody
 Archie Brown
 John Browne
 James Jeffery Bull
 Kathryn Lee Calame
 Colin Camerer
 Peter Carey
 David Carrasco
 Paul M. Chaikin
 Martin Chalfie
 Uma Chowdhry
 William A.V. Clark
 David Charles Clary
 Vincent Paul Crawford
 Michael Cunningham
 Gretchen C. Daily
 Richard J. Davidson
 Percy A. Deift
 Michel Henri Devoret
 William Eric Dietrich
 Jennifer A. Doudna Cate
 James Economy
 Robert N. Eisenman
 Stephen Elledge
 Rochelle Easton Esposito
 Lawrence Craig Evans
 Paul G. Falkowski
 Larry R. Faulkner
 Hartry Field
 Martin Filler
 Eric Fischl
 Matthew P.A. Fisher
 Richard W. Fisher
 Joel L. Fleishman
 Perry Allen Frey
 William Henry Gates Sr.
 Bernd Giese
 Donald Philip Green
 Michael Eldon Greenberg
 Carol W. Greider
 Thomas C. Grey
 Peter Gruss
 Richard Hamilton
 John Mark Hansen
 Harry D. Harootunian
 Stanley M. Hauerwas
 Martin F. Hellwig
 Thomas English Hill, Jr.
 Geoffrey E. Hinton
 Jules Alphonse Hoffmann
 Peter Uwe Hohendahl
 Thomas C. Holt
 Paul Lyon Houston
 Stephen P. Hubbell
 Randall Gardner Hulet
 Linda Hutcheon
 Samuel Issacharoff
 Charles Johnson
 Iain M. Johnstone
 Boyan Jovanovic
 Kenneth L. Judd
 William Kahan
 Louis Kaplow
 Nicholas M. Katz
 Thomas Joseph Katz
 Robert A. Katzmann
 Paul Kellogg
 Anthony John Patrick Kenny
 Laura L. Kiessling
 Joseph L. Kirschvink
 Michael Lawrence Klein
 Leonard Kleinrock
 Thomas B. Kornberg
 Michael Kremer
 Robert Eugene Krumlauf
 Jeri Laber
 Donald Quincy Lamb, Jr.
 Hermione Lee
 Martin L. Leibowitz
 Frank Thomson Leighton
 Arthur Levitt, Jr.
 Judy C. Lewent
 Fred S. Licht
 Dan Littman
 Elizabeth F. Loftus
 Tanya Marie Luhrmann
 Neil MacGregor
 Ellen M. Markman
 Konrad Mauersberger
 Doug McAdam
 Andrew P. McMahon
 John J. Mearsheimer
 Silvio Micali
 Fergus Graham Burtholme Millar
 Sherrill Milnes
 Peter Bartlett Moore
 Robert F. Nagel
 Lutz Niethammer
 Sigrid Nunez
 Maynard V. Olson
 Julio Mario Ottino
 Jessie Ann Owens
 Stephen W. Pacala
 Craig Packer
 Benjamin Ingrim Page
 Henry Petroski
 S. George H. Philander
 Jerome B. Posner
 Geoffrey Keith Pullum
 Adrian Raftery
 George H. Rieke
 Helmuth Rilling
 R.G. Hamish Robertson
 Sharon Percy Rockefeller
 Janet Rossant
 David John Sainsbury
 Osvaldo E. Sala
 Michael J. Sandel
 Ed Parish Sanders
 Harry N. Scheiber
 Douglas W. Schemske
 Kay Lehman Schlozman
 Wilfried Schmid
 Alan Shapiro
 Cindy Sherman
 Rae Silver
 Samuel C. Silverstein
 Ralph D. Snyderman
 Patricia G. Spear
 Richard M. Stallman
 Mriganka Sur
 Larry William Swanson
 Alexander Sandor Szalay
 Guido Tabellini
 Hue-Tam Ho Tai
 Lynne Talley
 Kathleen C. Taylor
 Shelley E. Taylor
 Laurel Thatcher Ulrich
 William G. Unruh
 Ellen S. Vitetta
 Andrew Baruch Wachtel
 Marvalee H. Wake
 Arthur Weiss
 Zena Werb
 William Tobey Wickner
 Ellen Dudley Williams
 Thongchai Winichakul
 Niklaus Wirth
 Michael Witzel
 Lawrence Wolff
 Michael Wood

2004 

 Lilia A. Abron
 Guenter Ahlers
 Huda Akil
 David Aldous
 Armand Paul Alivisatos
 James E. Alt
 James L. Axtell
 Tania Ann Baker
 Abhijit Vinayak Banerjee
 Moungi G. Bawendi
 Peter Beak
 Mark Firman Bear
 Ann Beattie
 Steven V. W. Beckwith
 Arden L. Bement, Jr.
 Jonathan Bendor
 Charles L. Bennett
 Edward J. Benz Jr.
 Paul Franklin Berliner
 Ned Block
 Jean F. P. Blondel
 Philip Chase Bobbitt
 Gary G. Borisy
 Mary Cunningham Boyce
 Vladimir Borisovich Braginsky
 Joan W. Bresnan
 Marilynn B. Brewer
 Richard H. Brodhead
 Jeremy Israel Bulow
 Claude R. Canizares
 Thomas James Carew
 Marian B. Carlson
 Dipesh Chakrabarty
 Moses H. W. Chan
 Bernard Chazelle
 Carol T. Christ
 James H. Clark
 Yves Colin de Verdiere
 David Collier
 Michael A. Cook
 Murray S. Daw
 Philippe de Montebello
 Mark E. Dean
 Rodolfo Dirzo
 Alexander W. Dreyfoos, Jr.
 Catherine Dulac
 R. Lawrence Edwards
 Scott D. Emr
 Donald Max Engelman
 Bernard Lucas Feringa
 Andrew Z. Fire
 George Philip Fletcher
 Paul A. Fleury
 Carl Frieden
 William Arthur Galston
 Donald Emil Ganem
 Dedre Gentner
 Andrea Mia Ghez
 Loren Ghiglione
 Steven M. Girvin
 Herbert Gleiter
 Alvin Ira Goldman
 Jeffrey Ivan Gordon
 Michael J. Graetz
 Avner Greif
 Sten Grillner
 Leonard Gross
 Barbara J. Grosz
 David C. Grove
 Leonard P. Guarente
 Werner L. Gundersheimer
 Donald A. Gurnett
 Joel F. Handler
 Jeffrey A. Harvey
 Michael Hechter
 Bernd Heinrich
 Susan Hockfield
 Frances Degen Horowitz
 Steven E. Hyman
 Eric N. Jacobsen
 Guillermo Jaim Etcheverry
 James Larry Jameson
 Brian D. Joseph
 Takeo Kanade
 Roger E. Kasperson
 Anatole Katok
 Anselm Kiefer
 Jürgen Kocka
 Guy Laroque
 Edward D. Lazowska
 Ho-Wang Lee
 Mark R. Lepper
 Bruce R. Levin
 Jay A. Levy
 Fang-Hua Lin
 Lucio Luzzatto
 Yuri I. Manin
 Brice Marden
 Donald Anthony Martin
 Manuel Martinez-Maldonado
 John F. McDonnell
 Curtis W. Meadows Jr.
 Wayne A. Meeks
 Thomas Wendell Merrill
 Paul Lawrence Modrich
 Richard G. M. Morris
 C. Dan Mote, Jr.
 Alfred H. Mueller
 Joseph R. Nevins
 Mark A. Noll
 Michael John Novacek
 Erin K. O'Shea
 Maurice Obstfeld
 Sharon Olds
 Norman Jay Ornstein
 Lyman Alexander Page, Jr.
 Thalia Papayannopoulou
 Gustavo Perez-Firmat
 Carl Phillips
 Janet Breckenridge Pierrehumbert
 Stuart L. Pimm
 William H. Pritchard
 William B. Quandt
 Peter A. Railton
 Linda Lea Randall
 Lisa Randall
 Gerhard Richter
 Loren H. Rieseberg
 Gene Ezia Robinson
 Christina Romer
 Nancy Lipton Rosenblum
 Gerald Rosenfeld
 Peter Jacob Rossky
 Ed Ruscha
 Donald G. Saari
 Henry Samueli
 Aziz Sancar
 Paul Spyros Sarbanes
 Sosale Shankara Sastry
 Mark A. Satterthwaite
 Henry Frederick Schaefer III
 Samuel Scheffler
 Norbert Schwarz
 Anne Firor Scott
 William H. Sewell, Jr.
 Stephen Skowronek
 Rogers M. Smith
 Patty Stonesifer
 Peter L. Strick
 Jean Strouse
 Subra Suresh
 Masatoshi Takeichi
 Anne M. Tatlock
 Gang Tian
 Judith Tick
 Joan Tower
 James Turrell
 Peter V. Ueberroth
 Graham C. Walker
 Douglas C. Wallace
 Nolan R. Wallach
 Bess B. Ward
 Robert H. Waterston
 Rubie S. Watson
 Timothy Endicott Wirth
 Diane P. Wood
 Michael Woodford
 Yu Xie
 George D. Yancopoulos
 Lai-Sang Young
 Mary Alice Zimmerman
 Maria T. Zuber
 Paul Zuckerman
 Ellen Taaffe Zwilich

2005 

 Qais Al-Awqati
 John Leonard Anderson
 William Franklin Baker
 Jack M. Balkin
 Daniel Barenboim
 Barry Clark Barish
 Omer Bartov
 Jane A. Bernstein
 Truman F. Bewley
 John P. Birkelund
 Rebecca Blank
 David E. Bloom
 Yve-Alain Bois
 Daniel Boyarin
 William Bruce Bridges
 Richard Brilliant
 Sergey Brin
 Tom Brokaw
 Nancy E. Burns
 Guillermo A. Calvo
 Chen Yi
 James Samuel Clark
 Rodney J. Clifton
 John Henry Coatsworth
 Barry Spencer Coller
 Joseph Hurd Connell
 E. Gerald Corrigan
 Harvey Dale
 Victoria de Grazia
 Edward Francis DeLong
 Joseph Mark DeSimone
 E. J. Dionne, Jr.
 Christopher B. Donnan
 Nicholas Michael Donofrio
 Gideon Dreyfuss
 Herbert Edelsbrunner
 James Engell
 Susan Tufts Fiske
 Sheila Fitzpatrick
 Edith Flanigen
 Eric Mark Friedlander
 Jerome H. Friedman
 Fred H. Gage
 Zvi Galil
 Lynn Garafola
 David Ginsburg
 Alfred L. Goldberg
 Susan J. Goldin-Meadow
 Rebecca Goldstein
 Donald Graham
 Iva S. Greenwald
 M.R.C. Greenwood
 Jack D. Griffith
 John V. Guttag
 Niels Hansen
 Gilbert H. Harman
 Stanley R. Hart
 Robert Hass
 Alan Hastings
 Fumio Hayashi
 John E. Heuser
 Werner Hildenbrand
 Peter B. Hirsch
 John P. Hirth
 Michael Hofmann
 Robert Hollander
 John T. Irwin
 Judith Jamison
 David C. Jewitt
 Madeleine M. Joullie
 David Julius
 Elena Kagan
 Brewster Kahle
 Duncan McLean Kennedy
 David I. Kertzer
 Alice Kessler-Harris
 David Mark Kingsley
 William C. Kirby
 Paul David Klemperer
 Jeff Koons
 Laurence J. Kotlikoff
 Conrad Phillip Kottak
 Stephen C. Kowalczykowski
 Louis M. Kunkel
 Thomas G. Kurtz
 Tony Kushner
 Frederick K. Lamb
 Naomi R. Lamoreaux
 Charles Larmore
 Sylvia Ann Law
 Gregory Lawler
 Richard Borshay Lee
 Ronald Demos Lee
 Robert Legvold
 Keith E. Lehrer
 Alan I. Leshner
 Maya Ying Lin
 Richard Michael Locksley
 Gerhard Loewenberg
 Jay Lorsch
 Glenn D. Lowry
 Alexander Lubotzky
 Alison Lurie
 Allan Hugh MacDonald
 Trudy F. C. Mackay
 Catharine Alice MacKinnon
 Gerald Dennis Mahan
 Tak Wah Mak
 Robert Charles Malenka
 Andrew Robert Marks
 Rowena Green Matthews
 John Wilbur McCarter, Jr.
 John J. McCarthy
 Brenda Milner
 Ann S. Moore
 Mark Morris
 Stephen Edward Morris
 Eric J. Nestler
 Barbara Jane Newman
 Hiroshi Nikaido
 Daniel G. Nocera
 Michael Lester Norman
 Ralph George Nuzzo
 Peter Lee Olson
 Lawrence Page
 Alberto Palloni
 Thomas D. Petes
 Julia M. Phillips
 Dolores Rita Piperno
 Sidney Poitier
 Harold Vincent Poor
 Charles Dale Poulter
 Earl A. Powell III
 Robert L. Powell
 Robert Charles Pozen
 Francine Prose
 Anne Pusey
 Anna Marie Pyle
 Tom A. Rapoport
 Louis French Reichardt
 Harriet Ritvo
 Donald John Roberts
 Henry L. Roediger III
 Elizabeth Barlow Rogers
 Ned Rorem
 Robert I. Rotberg
 Linda Preiss Rothschild
 John Wallis Rowe
 Margarita Salas
 Richard P. Saller
 Robert J. Sampson
 John Thomas Sayles
 Norman J. Schofield
 Frederick A. O. Schwarz, Jr.
 
 Thomas J. Silhavy
 Margaret C. Simms
 Barry Martin Simon
 Michael Ellman Soule
 Steven W. Squyres
 Janice Gross Stein
 Susan Stewart
 Gary Struhl
 Galen D. Stucky
 Oscar Tang
 David Anthony Tirrell
 Robert L. Trivers
 Michael Turelli
 Kamil Ugurbil
 Axel Ullrich
 Cumrun Vafa
 Peter van Inwagen
 Ajit P. Varki
 Peter K. Vogt
 Neil Wallace
 Stephen M. Walt
 Mark W. Watson
 Samuel Miles Weber
 Rüdiger Wehner
 David C. Weinstein
 Nancy Sabin Wexler
 Christian Wolff
 Ada Yonath

References 

1994